The West Palm Beach Barracudas were a professional minor league ice hockey team based in West Palm Beach, Florida. They played in the Sunshine Hockey League, later renamed the Southern Hockey League, from 1992 to 1996. They played their games at the West Palm Beach Auditorium.

History

The team was founded, by two Montana ranchers, Jim King and Bill Nyrop, formerly of the NHL Montreal Canadiens,  as the Blaze in 1992.  One of the inaugural franchises of the Sunshine Hockey League, a league with six teams mostly based in Florida. They dominated the Sunshine Hockey League, finishing with the best record and winning the championship in each year of the league's existence, defeating the Jacksonville Bullets each time in the finals.

After the Sunshine Hockey League transformed into the Southern Hockey League, they were reformed as the West Palm Beach Barracudas but were unable to duplicate their success, finishing with a losing record.  They folded along with the league after one season, when their home venue, the Coliseum was closed to the public and sold.

Season-by-season record

External links
Team profile at HockeyDB.com

Defunct ice hockey teams in the United States
Sports in West Palm Beach, Florida
Ice hockey teams in Florida
Sunshine Hockey League teams
Southern Hockey League (1995–96) teams
1992 establishments in Florida
1996 disestablishments in Florida
Ice hockey clubs established in 1992
Sports clubs disestablished in 1996